Spark was a Thoroughbred stallion who was among the early imports of Thoroughbred horses to America. The Belair Stud stables were associated with him and a mare, Queen Mab, also imported in this period. Frederick, Prince of Wales gave the stallion to Samuel Ogle, the governor of Maryland, as a gift.

Background 
Spark was foaled in 1743. He was bred by and originally the property of Charles Fleetwood, Esquire.  Fleetwood gave Spark to Frederick Louis, the Prince of Wales. The Prince of Wales, gave the stallion to Lord Baltimore to give to Samuel Ogle, Provincial Governor of Maryland as a present. Spark was already known in the British Isles. An 1898 account described Spark as the "first pedigree horse" imported to Maryland.

One account states that Ogle took Spark back to the American Colonies from England in the Spring of 1747. Another says that Lord Baltimore gave the horse to Ogle "about" 1750. This was Ogle's last tour of duty to replace Thomas Bladen, the past governor of the British colony of Maryland. The pedigree of Spark is unclear and somewhat disputed. Historian Fairfax Harrison concluded that Spark was the product of the mare Miss Colville and stallion Aleppo. Henry William Herbert records that Weatherby's Stud Book (General Stud Book) has Spark by Honeycomb Punch out of Wilke's old Hautboy mare, which is believed to be another name for Miss Colville.  The pedigree record bears the seal of Lord Baltimore. It shows that Aleppo came from the Darley Arabian bloodline. They also show that Queen Mab came from thoroughbred stock through Musgrover's grey Arabian. Benjamin Tasker, Jr. claims he had handwritten records on May 20, 1758, from breeders associated with Spark concerning his pedigree. The American descendant records of Spark shows he sired a line of horses claimed to be very fast.  By 1787, descent from Spark and Queen Mab was used in advertising to promote breeding stallions.

Belair 

The importation of Spark and Queen Mab was the start of the development of the American purebred racehorse field. These two horses established the Belair Stud legacy for the bloodlines of the future. The Belair Manor property was a horse breeding farm and stables for Thoroughbred race horses. This area of Maryland became known as the American Cradle of Thoroughbred Racing. Benjamin Tasker, Jr. was the original owner of this prominent well-known property and mansion. He gave it to his sister Anne as a wedding gift when she married Ogle in 1739.

The Manor property originally consisted of a Georgian colonial style red brick mansion and 3,600 acres of land. Governor Ogle built here the first Belair stables and a racetrack for Spark from a 600-acre part of the property. Ogle had next his townhouse in Annapolis at King George Street and Tabernacle Street another racetrack. This way he could watch Spark from his drawing room when he was there for races. Maryland governors Charles Carnan Ridgely, Robert Wright, Edward Lloyd, Samuel Sprigg and Oden Bowie kept the tradition, started by Spark of thoroughbred racing, going by breeding their own race horses.

Notes

References

Sources 
 
 
 
 
 
 
 
 
 
 
 

 
 
 
 

1743 racehorse births
Thoroughbred family 28
Racehorses bred in the United Kingdom